Kosovo National Stadium is a proposed football stadium in near Drenas, Kosovo. This proposed stadium would be the new home of the Kosovo national team and it would serve as a venue for major football club cup finals and other sports and non-sports related activities.

The stadium was designed with a capacity to seat 30,000 spectators, making it the highest capacity football stadium in Kosovo. The stadium is planned to be completed by 2021.

Location
In 2019, the Government of Kosovo has decided that this stadium will be built near Drenas, approving the request of Minister of Culture, Youth and Sports, Kujtim Gashi. The location is 14 kilometers away from capital city of Pristina, rejecting the option selected by the previous government, which was Bërnica. The national stadium will be built on a  site in Sankoc, and work should have begin in 2020. There was a lot of debate about the stadium, calling it a political decision, as it was originally planned to be built in Bërnica.

History

Planning and construction
On 12 July 2019, the construction of stadium began, and two days later the project of this stadium was presented which would have a capacity of 30,000 seats, but after the presentation, the construction was suspended for political reasons related to the location.

Naming
There were a lot of ideas and propositions for naming the new stadium.

Facilities
Based on the plans presented by Tabanlıoğlu Architects, Kosovo National Stadium will have:
 Training grounds
 Retail
 Parking
 Nursery
 Museum
 Library
 Indoor swimming pool
 Hotel

References

Drenica
Proposed stadiums
Football venues in Kosovo
Kosovo national football team